David Dyer (born 3 December 1946) is a South African cricketer. He played in 109 first-class matches between 1965 and 1982. His father, Dennis Dyer, was also an international cricketer. Dyer was captain of Transvaal during the 1970s.

See also
 International cricket in South Africa from 1971 to 1981

References

External links
 

1946 births
Living people
South African cricketers
KwaZulu-Natal cricketers
Gauteng cricketers
Place of birth missing (living people)
University of Natal alumni